Dugdale Field was a stadium located in Seattle, Washington.  It was primarily used for baseball and was the home of Seattle Indians and  Seattle Giants. The ballpark had a capacity of 15,000 people and was built in 1913.  It was destroyed by fire in July 1932.  It was named after Daniel E. Dugdale who was a baseball pioneer in the area. Dugdale had built a previous ball park called Yesler Way Park, at the intersection of 12th Avenue and Yesler Way in 1907.  It was often referred to as Dugdale Park but predates the larger and later stadium built in Rainier Valley. The panoramic photo displayed in this article appears to be the earlier Yesler Way Park, dated in 1907. 

Dugdale Field also hosted the first football game featuring an NFL team in Seattle. On January 31, 1926, the Chicago Bears beat the Washington All Stars 34–0 in an exhibition game. Dugdale Field was burned down in an Independence Day arson fire in 1932. Sick's Stadium was built at the same location, and the Indians were renamed the Rainiers after they moved to Sick's Stadium.

References

1913 establishments in Washington (state)
1932 disestablishments in Washington (state)
1932 fires in the United States
Baseball venues in Seattle
Defunct minor league baseball venues
Sports venues completed in 1913
Sports venues demolished in 1932
American football venues in Washington (state)
Demolished sports venues in Washington (state)